Trigonidium acuminatum is an orchid found from Colombia to Bolivia and from Suriname to Venezuela.

Taxonomy

The specific epithet acuminatum is derived from the acuminate shape of the sepals as compared to other species.

Description

The long sepals form a tubular flower that opens at the end. The reddish eyespots of the small petals are located within the tube. These eyespots attract male bees to perform pseudocopulation with the orchid's blossom. The petals are ovoid and taper at the tip, and are similar in hue to the sepals. The lip and column are hidden within the tube.

References

Orchids of South America
Maxillariinae